Rosia may refer to:

Rosia, the Greek name for Rus' (region)
Rosia, Sovicille, a village in Tuscany, Italy
Roșia (disambiguation), villages in Romania
Roșia Montană, a commune in Romania
Roșia, a tributary of the river Dorna in Romania
Rosia Airfield, a World War II military airfield
Rosia Bay, the only natural harbour in Gibraltar